Ros Casares Godella was a professional women's basketball team based in Godella, Spain. It played in the Liga Femenina de Baloncesto between 1996 and 2012, when it resigned to play in EuroLeague and Spanish League. It continued playing in Primera División Femenina, third tier of Spanish women's basketball, until 2014 when the club was integrated in Valencia Basket as its women's section.

History
The club was founded in 1996 as Popular Bàsquet Godella. In 1998, the construction company Ros Casares acquired the team and in 2001 the club won its first league with this denomination.

The following season defended the title, won its first national cup and made its debut in the EuroLeague. In subsequent years the team became a regular in the EuroLeague and fought tightly with UB Barcelona, which disappeared in 2007. That season marked the beginning of Ros Casares' golden era, with four national doubles in a row and two EuroLeague finals lost to Spartak Moscow Region.

Following an unsuccessful 2010–11 season where Ros Casares lost the national titles to Perfumerías Avenida and Rivas Ecópolis the team was greatly strengthened and it won the 2012 EuroLeague by beating UMMC Ekaterinburg, Spartak Moscow Region, Wisła Kraków and finally Rivas Ecópolis in the new Final Eight, in addition to its eighth national championship. However, the club announced it would be disbanded just two months later, but finally continued playing in lower divisions.

In May 2014, Ros Casares agreed all the teams of the club will be integrated in Valencia Basket since the 2014–15 season.

Club names
 PB Godella
 Ros Casares Godella
 Ros Casares Valencia
 Ciudad Ros Casares Valencia
 Ros Casares Godella

Season by season

FIBA competition record

Honours

International
  European Cup / EuroLeague (1): 2012

National
 Liga (8): 2001, 2002, 2004, 2007, 2008, 2009, 2010, 2012
 Copa de la Reina (7):  2002, 2003, 2004, 2007, 2008, 2009, 2010
 Supercopa de España (6): 2004, 2005, 2007, 2008, 2009, 2010

2011–12

WNBA Players
WNBA players who have played for Ros Casares Valencia include Lauren Jackson, Sancho Lyttle, Chamique Holdsclaw, Maya Moore, Małgorzata Dydek, DeLisha Milton-Jones, Katie Douglas, Candice Wiggins, Becky Hammon, Ann Wauters, Razija Mujanović, Jana Veselá, Belinda Snell, Amaya Valdemoro, Rebekkah Brunson, Suzy Batkovic, Elisa Aguilar, Anna Montañana, Trisha Fallon, Shannon Johnson, Marta Fernández, Murriel Page, Evanthia Maltsi  and Eshaya Murphy. Nicky Anosike and Taj McWilliams-Franklin have also played for the club.

References

External links
 Official website

Women's basketball teams in Spain
Basketball teams established in 1996
EuroLeague Women clubs
Basketball teams disestablished in 2014
Basketball teams in the Valencian Community
Province of Valencia